Hermann Josef Matula (played by Claus Theo Gärtner) is a character on the German detective show Ein Fall für Zwei.

Matula is one of the two main characters on the show, and the only character to have appeared in every episode so far. Matula is a  former police officer who has become a private detective instead. He always works in co-operation with a defense attorney, who is the other main character on the show.

The character of the defense attorney has changed several times in the lifetime of the show. In chronological order, the attorneys have been Dieter Renz, Rainer Franck, Johannes Voss and Markus Lessing, who is the current attorney. The former attorneys left the show because of various reasons: Renz retired due to his old age, Franck accepted a job as a teacher at a law school, and Voss was shot dead by an escaping criminal.

In the beginning of the first episode in 1981 he mentioned his birthplace to be Oberhausen and his age to be 31 years. So he was going to celebrate his 60th birthday in 2010. Despite this advanced age, Matula is in good physical condition and can put up quite a fight when challenged. According to research done by a German fan of the show, Matula has been beaten up 37 times and knocked unconscious 7 times. Still he somehow manages to stay healthy and fit for his duty.

Matula's method of detective work is very direct and hands-down. While the attorney he works with handles the juridistical part of the current case, Matula gets his hands dirty and tracks down the people he suspects of being involved in the crimes. This frequently involves him posing as a reporter or other similar profession to avoid discovery. Matula's direct, action-oriented way of work often gets him into trouble with the police. He has been arrested 12 times, and the entire plot of one episode centered on Matula being suspected of murder and having to escape the police into Austria.

Despite his toughness, Matula is a skilled cook and has a great deal of charm with women. However, he has never been married.

References
Fan site page on Matula 
Famous detectives page on Matula 

Matula, Josef